On 2 November 2021, a major insurgent attack occurred at the Sardar Mohammad Daoud Khan Military Hospital in Kabul, Afghanistan. At least 25 people were killed.

Background
Islamic State began an insurgency in Afghanistan in 2015. They claimed responsibility for a 2017 attack on Daoud Khan hospital.

Attack
On 2 November 2021, bombers and gunmen attacked Daoud Khan Military Hospital in Kabul, Afghanistan. A suicide bomber on a motorcycle detonated his explosives at the gate of the hospital followed by four attackers. The attackers stormed the hospital and killed multiple people including Mawlawi Hamdullah Mukhlis leader of the Kabul Corps of the Islamic Army of Afghanistan who was also known as the "Conqueror of Kabul" after he became the first senior Taliban figure to occupy the Afghanistan presidential palace during the August 15, 2021 Taliban takeover of Kabul. The attack was followed by a second more powerful explosion also at the gate. Taliban commando then arrived via helicopter and engaged in a firefight with the Islamic state gun leading to the deaths of all the attackers. The attack killed at least 25 people and wounded 50 more.

Responsibility
The Islamic State – Khorasan Province claimed responsibility for the attack.

See also
 List of terrorist attacks in Kabul

References

2021 in Kabul
Terrorist incidents in Afghanistan in 2021
2021 murders in Afghanistan
21st-century mass murder in Afghanistan
Attacks on buildings and structures in 2021
Attacks on buildings and structures in Kabul
November 2021 crimes in Asia
ISIL terrorist incidents in Afghanistan
Islamic terrorist incidents in 2021
Mass murder in 2021
Suicide bombings in 2021
Mass shootings in Afghanistan